Let's All Be Americans Now is a World War I song written and composed by Irving Berlin, Edgar Leslie, and George W. Meyer. The song was first published in 1917 by Waterson, Berlin & Snyder Co., in New York, NY.The sheet music cover depicts a soldier with his rifle and silhouetted marching soldiers in the background. A popular recording in 1917 was made by the American Quartet.
 
The sheet music can be found at the Pritzker Military Museum & Library.

References

Bibliography 
Parker, Bernard S. World War I Sheet Music 1. Jefferson: McFarland & Company, Inc., 2007. . 
Paas, John Roger. 2014. America sings of war: American sheet music from World War I. . 
Vogel, Frederick G. World War I Songs: A History and Dictionary of Popular American Patriotic Tunes, with Over 300 Complete Lyrics. Jefferson: McFarland & Company, Inc., 1995. . 

Songs about the United States
1917 songs
Songs of World War I
Songs written by Irving Berlin
Songs written by Edgar Leslie
Songs written by George W. Meyer